Blóðdropinn (Drop of Blood) is an annual Icelandic literary award for the best crime novel of the previous year, which has been awarded since 2007. The author of the winning novel becomes Iceland's candidate for the Glass Key award.

Winners

References

External links 
The Drop of Blood on the Reykjavík City of Literature website

Icelandic literary awards
Mystery and detective fiction awards